Jaylen Watkins (born November 27, 1991) is a former American football safety. He played college football for the University of Florida. He was drafted by the Philadelphia Eagles in the fourth round of the 2014 NFL Draft.

High school
A native of Cape Coral, Florida, Watkins attended Cape Coral High School. He played quarterback, wide receiver and defensive back at Cape Coral, leading his team to an 11–1 record in his senior season, advancing to the FHSAA 4A Regional semifinals. He passed for 1,230 yards and 13 touchdowns as a senior and rushed for 928 yards with 10 touchdowns. He also had 29 receptions for 461 yards and five touchdowns. He also ran track at Cape Coral and advanced to the 4A Track Championships in the 4x100 relay. He was selected to play in the 2010 U.S. Army All-American Bowl in San Antonio, Texas.

Considered a four-star recruit by Rivals.com, he was rated as the fourth best cornerback prospect in his class.

College career
Watkins attended the University of Florida from 2010 to 2013. He appeared in 48 games, with 28 starts, at both cornerback and safety. He primarily played special teams as a freshman, before earning an increased role in the defense as a sophomore and throughout his tenure at Florida. During his career, he accumulated 133 tackles, including four for loss, 21 pass breakups and three interceptions.

Professional career

Philadelphia Eagles
Watkins was drafted by the Philadelphia Eagles in the fourth round (101st overall) of the 2014 NFL Draft.

On September 5, 2015, Watkins was released by the Eagles.

Buffalo Bills
On September 7, 2015, Watkins was signed to the Buffalo Bills' practice squad and practiced with his brother Sammy Watkins.

Philadelphia Eagles (second stint)
On November 27, 2015, Watkins was re-signed by the Eagles off the Bills' practice squad.

On March 4, 2017, Watkins signed a one-year extension with the Eagles. Watkins won a Super Bowl ring when the Eagles defeated the New England Patriots in Super Bowl LII.

Los Angeles Chargers
On March 30, 2018, Watkins signed a one-year contract with the Los Angeles Chargers. In the Chargers' second preseason game, Watkins suffered a torn ACL and was placed on injured reserve on August 19, 2018.

On February 15, 2019, Watkins re-signed with the Chargers.

Houston Texans
On March 30, 2020, Watkins signed a two-year contract with the Houston Texans. He was released on September 5, 2020.

Los Angeles Chargers (second stint)
On November 7, 2020, Watkins was signed to the Los Angeles Chargers' practice squad. He was elevated to the active roster on November 21 and December 17 for the team's weeks 11 and 15 games against the New York Jets and Las Vegas Raiders, and reverted to the practice squad after each game. On January 1, 2021, Watkins was promoted to the active roster.

Personal life
He is the older half-brother of Baltimore Ravens wide receiver Sammy Watkins.

References

External links
Twitter
Rotoworld profile
Florida Gators bio

Living people
1991 births
People from Cape Coral, Florida
American football cornerbacks
Players of American football from Florida
Florida Gators football players
Philadelphia Eagles players
Buffalo Bills players
Houston Texans players
Los Angeles Chargers players